Ed Morse is a Hayden Idaho businessman and real estate consultant.  He hold BS and MBA degrees from the University of Idaho, and graduated from Gonzaga University Law school, cum laude.  He has a real estate valuation practice.  He invests in and develops real estate.  He served on the Idaho Real Estate Appraisal Board, and the Appraisal Qualification Board of the Appraisal Foundation, which he chaired.  He served in the Republican Idaho State Representative from 2012 to 2014.

Early life, education, and career
Morse earned a Bachelor of Science and Master of Business Administration from University of Idaho and a Juris Doctor from Gonzaga University School of Law.

Idaho House of Representatives
In 2012, after redistricting, Morse challenged incumbent representative and tax protester Phil Hart in a four-way primary and won the Republican nomination and the general election. In 2014, Morse was challenged in the Republican primary and lost to Eric Redman.

Committee assignments
Morse served on the Business Committee, the Environment, Energy, and Technology Committee, and the Health and Welfare Committee from 2012 to 2014.

Elections

References

External links
Ed Morse at the Idaho Legislature
Campaign site
 

Year of birth missing (living people)
Living people
Gonzaga University School of Law alumni
Republican Party members of the Idaho House of Representatives
People from Prosser, Washington
People from Hayden, Idaho
University of Idaho alumni